Sandtown may refer to:
Sandtown, Delaware, an unincorporated community in Kent County, Delaware, USA
Sandtown, Georgia, a neighborhood in Atlanta, Georgia, USA
Sandtown, New Jersey, an unincorporated community in Southampton Township, New Jersey, USA
Sandtown-Winchester, Baltimore, a neighborhood in Baltimore, Maryland, USA
Sandtown, Ontario, a neighborhood in South Stormont, Ontario, Canada